Justin Skyler Fields (born March 5, 1999) is an American football quarterback for the Chicago Bears of the National Football League (NFL). Following a stint with Georgia, he played college football at Ohio State, where he twice won Graham–George Offensive Player of the Year and reached the 2021 College Football Playoff National Championship. Fields was selected by the Bears in the first round of the 2021 NFL Draft, with whom he set the single-game regular season record for quarterback rushing yards. He is also one of only three NFL quarterbacks to rush for 1,000 yards in a season.

Early years
Fields attended Harrison High School in Kennesaw, Georgia. In two years as the starting quarterback for Harrison, he totaled 4,187 passing yards, 41 passing touchdowns, 2,096 rushing yards and 28 rushing touchdowns. In the summer before his senior year in 2017, he attended the Elite 11 quarterback competition and was named MVP of the event. Late in his senior year, in a game that was nationally televised on ESPN, he suffered a broken finger that required season ending surgery. After his senior season, he was named Mr. Georgia Football by the Touchdown Club of Atlanta, as well as first-team all-state. In addition to football, Fields was also a standout baseball player for Harrison High.

Fields was rated as a five-star recruit and was the highest rated dual-threat quarterback in the class of 2018 by ESPN, Rivals.com, and 247Sports.com. ESPN listed him as the top recruit overall, while Rivals and 247Sports ranked him second behind fellow quarterback Trevor Lawrence.

In October 2017, Fields committed to the University of Georgia to play college football after withdrawing a previous commitment to Penn State. His senior year was documented in the second season of the Netflix series QB1: Beyond the Lights (2018).

College career

Georgia
In his true freshman season at Georgia in 2018, Fields served as the backup to starting quarterback Jake Fromm. In Georgia's season opener against Austin Peay, Fields made his debut in the second quarter and started the second half. He completed seven of eight passes on the day, including a 10-yard touchdown pass to Isaac Nauta in the 45–0 victory. On September 29, against Tennessee, he had five carries for 45 rushing yards and two rushing touchdowns in the 38–12 victory. In a late-season 66–27 rout of UMass, Fields threw two touchdowns passes and ran for another on the ground, finishing with 121 passing yards and 100 rushing yards.

During the 2018 season, Fields saw action in 12 games, totaling 328 passing yards, four passing touchdowns, 266 rushing yards, and four rushing touchdowns. Following Georgia's loss to Alabama in the 2018 SEC Championship Game, Fields announced his intent to transfer to Ohio State.

Ohio State
Fields, who would normally be required to sit out for one year due to NCAA transfer rules, sought a waiver to be able to play immediately for Ohio State. Fields enlisted the help of attorney Thomas Mars, who helped secure immediate eligibility for several transfers from Ole Miss in 2018, including quarterback Shea Patterson. Mars and Fields argued that Fields should be granted a waiver for immediate eligibility due to an NCAA guideline that waives the waiting period for athletes with "documented mitigating circumstances that are outside the student-athlete’s control and directly impact the health, safety and well-being of the student-athlete." Fields was subject to an incident at Georgia in which a Bulldogs baseball player used a racial slur against Fields. This was believed to be the main incident constituting Fields' claim of "mitigating circumstances", although the full contents of the waiver request were never made public. On February 8, 2019, Fields was granted immediate eligibility for the 2019 season by the NCAA.

2019

In Fields' first season with the Buckeyes, he helped lead the team to a Big Ten Championship with a 34–21 victory over Wisconsin, and a spot in the College Football Playoff. Fields finished in third in voting for the Heisman Trophy, was named the Big Ten Offensive Player of the Year and first-team all-conference. In the 2019 Fiesta Bowl against Clemson, he had 320 passing yards, one touchdown, and two interceptions in the 29–23 loss in the College Football Playoff semifinal. He finished the season with 3,273 passing yards, 41 passing touchdowns, and three interceptions to go along with 484 rushing yards and ten rushing touchdowns.

2020
Fields entered the 2020 season as a leading candidate for the Heisman Trophy. The season was played amid the ongoing COVID-19 pandemic, with the Big Ten Conference ultimately opting for a shortened conference-only schedule after initially canceling. Fields was vocal in his support of playing the season, and he started an online petition that gathered over 320,000 signatures in support of that goal.

Fields helped lead the Buckeyes to another undefeated regular season and Big Ten Championship with a 22–10 victory over Northwestern. Ohio State received another bid to the College Football Playoff, playing a rematch against Clemson. Ohio State was victorious in the rematch, 49–28, with Fields throwing 385 passing yards and six touchdowns in the game. Fields took a hard hit to the midsection in the game, and played through the injury in a performance that Sports Illustrated dubbed "legendary". The Buckeyes advanced to the College Football Playoff National Championship, where they lost to Alabama, 52–24. Fields finished the shortened 2020 season with 2,100 passing yards, 22 passing touchdowns, six interceptions, and added 383 rushing yards and five rushing touchdowns on the ground. He repeated as the Big Ten's Offensive Player of the Year and unanimous first-team all-conference. On January 18, 2021, Fields announced that he would be forgoing his final two years of eligibility to enter the 2021 NFL Draft.

Statistics

Professional career

Fields was selected 11th overall in the 2021 NFL Draft by the Chicago Bears, who traded up with the New York Giants in exchange for the 20th overall pick, their fifth-round pick in 2021, and their first and fourth-round picks in 2022. A top quarterback prospect in the draft, Fields was one of five taken in the first round. He signed his four-year rookie contract, worth $18.8 million fully guaranteed, on June 10, 2021.

2021

Although Fields was named the second-string quarterback behind Andy Dalton, he made his NFL debut in the season opener against the Los Angeles Rams, taking the field on four plays. He scored a five-yard rushing touchdown and completed two passes for 10 yards in the 34–14 defeat. After Dalton suffered a knee injury during a Week 2 matchup against the Cincinnati Bengals, Fields entered the game in the third quarter. Fields completed six of 13 passes for 60 yards and one interception, while also rushing for 31 yards, as the Bears won 20–17. With Dalton sidelined from his injury, he was named the starter in the following week's matchup against the Cleveland Browns. His starting debut saw him sacked nine times, four and a half of which were delivered by defensive end Myles Garrett, while completing six of 20 passes for 68 yards. The Bears, who finished with 47 yards of offense, lost 26–6.

Fields won his first career start the next week in a 24–14 victory against the Detroit Lions. He completed 11 of 17 passes for 209 yards and had one interception off a deflected pass. After Fields was named the starter for the remainder of the season, he led the Bears to a 20–9 victory over the Las Vegas Raiders in Week 5, completing 12 of 20 passes for 111 yards and throwing his first touchdown pass to tight end Jesper Horsted. In Week 7 against the Tampa Bay Buccaneers, Fields committed five turnovers – three interceptions and two lost fumbles – as the Bears were defeated 38–3. Fields had his first 100-yard rushing game the next week against the San Francisco 49ers, throwing for 175 yards and a touchdown and also scored a rushing touchdown. However, the game ended in a 33–22 defeat, with Fields throwing an interception on the Bears' final drive. In the following week's Monday Night Football matchup with the Pittsburgh Steelers, Fields threw for a career-high 291 yards, but despite rallying to give the Bears a 27–26 lead in the fourth quarter, the Steelers pulled away to win 29–27.

In Week 11 against the Baltimore Ravens, Fields exited the game during the third quarter with an injury to his ribs. He was replaced by Dalton in the 16–13 loss. After the game, it was announced Fields had multiple cracked ribs, which forced him to miss the Bears' next two matchups. He returned in a Week 14 loss to the Green Bay Packers, but an ankle injury in the following week's defeat to the Minnesota Vikings sidelined him for another two games. Fields tested positive for COVID-19 ahead of the season finale, making the Week 15 game the last of his rookie year. He finished the season fifth in quarterback rushing yards at 420, the most among rookies, but also had the third-most quarterback fumbles at 12 and the second-most lost fumbles at five.

2022

Fields' 2022 season began with a 19–10 victory over the San Francisco 49ers, completing 8 of 17 passes for 121 yards, two touchdowns, and an interception. The Bears lost four of their next five games, including a three-game losing streak, which saw Fields complete 56.1% of his passes for 748 yards, two touchdowns, and four interceptions, and rush for 254 yards on 43 carries. The losing streak ended in Week 7 with a Monday Night Football victory over the New England Patriots, during which Fields completed 13 of 21 passes for 179 yards, a touchdown, and an interception, and rushed for 82 yards and a touchdown on 14 carries to secure the 33–14 upset.

In Week 9 against the Miami Dolphins, Fields set the NFL single-game regular season record for quarterback rushing yards at 178, surpassing Michael Vick's 20-year record. He also became the first NFL player to have three touchdown passes and rush for at least 150 yards in the same game. He also set the Bears franchise records for both the longest quarterback run and quarterback touchdown run off a 61-yard rushing touchdown. Despite his performance, the Bears lost 35–32. Fields was named the NFC Offensive Player of the Week following the game. In the next week's matchup with the Detroit Lions, Fields became the first NFL quarterback to rush for 140 yards in consecutive games and the first in the Super Bowl era to have multiple rushing touchdowns of over 60 yards. However, the Bears lost 31–30.

During a Week 11 loss to the Atlanta Falcons, Fields suffered an injury to his non-throwing shoulder, which sidelined him for a week. He returned in Week 13 against the Green Bay Packers and became the first quarterback in the Super Bowl era to rush for a touchdown in six consecutive games, although the Bears would lose 28–19. Fields suffered a hip injury in the Bears Week 17 loss to the Detroit Lions, which caused him to miss the season finale against the Minnesota Vikings.

Despite the Bears going 3–14, Fields threw for 2,242 yards, 17 touchdowns, 11 interceptions, and rushed for 1,143 yards and eight touchdowns in 15 games played. Fields became the third NFL quarterback to rush for 1,000 yards in a season after Michael Vick and Lamar Jackson. He also set the Bears single-season quarterback rushing yards record, eclipsing Bobby Douglass' 968 yards in 1972.

NFL career statistics

Personal life
Fields was diagnosed with epilepsy as a freshman in high school. His condition was made public during his pre-draft interviews with NFL teams in 2021. In high school, Fields had a score of 29 on his ACT and held a 3.9 grade point average. Fields also acknowledged in October 2022 that he uses yoga breathing techniques. Fields has stated that he maintains a vegan diet.

Fields was born to Gina Tobey and Ivant Fields. Ivant then married Jo Ann and had two children Jessica and Jaiden. Jaiden attends and plays softball at the University of Georgia.

References

External links

Chicago Bears bio
Ohio State Buckeyes bio
Georgia Bulldogs bio

1999 births
Living people
People from Kennesaw, Georgia
Sportspeople from Cobb County, Georgia
Players of American football from Georgia (U.S. state)
American football quarterbacks
Georgia Bulldogs football players
Ohio State Buckeyes football players
African-American players of American football
Chicago Bears players
People with epilepsy
21st-century African-American sportspeople